Golfo Aranci (Gallurese: Figari) is a comune (municipality) in the Province of Sassari in the Italian region Sardinia, located about  north of Cagliari and about  northeast of Olbia.

History
The town's name ("Gulf of the Oranges") derives from a recent Italianization of the Gallurese toponym Golfu di li Ranci ("Gulf of the Crabs"). Once known as Figari, the current town grew up in the mid-18th century as a fishing port. In the early 19th century a Royal Decree made it into the main port for the arrivals from the Italian mainland, contributing to its population growth.

References

External links

 Official website 

Cities and towns in Sardinia
1979 establishments in Italy
States and territories established in 1979